Biyagama is a suburb in Gampaha District, situated in the Western Province of Sri Lanka. It is 12 miles from Colombo. A Free Trade Zone was established in Biyagama in 1985.
"Kaduwela" interchange of expressway is located on Biyagama to Peliyagoda road.

See also 
 Biyagama Water Treatment Plant

References

Populated places in Gampaha District